"Above Horizons" is a 2009 song by CeCe Peniston, and the official PTA anthem as a tribute to the families, teachers and communities who help children reach their dreams through the PTA, which resulted from the singer's role being named a National Ambassador of the US volunteer child advocacy organization.

The ballad was released on the organization's recording label, National PTA Recordings in June 2009 as its first music release, that included overall four versions. Two mixes of the song were produced by a Detroit house music producer and DJ, Aaron-Carl Ragland, not long before his death.

Composition
"I'm definitely happy to be part of an organization that helps children reach their dreams. When I was younger, my parents always dared me to dream and I haven't stopped. So this is my tribute to the families, teachers and communities who help children reach their dreams through PTA," said Peniston. The PTA's message of parent involvement and student success is captured in the chorus:

Credits and personnel
 CeCe Peniston - lead vocal, writer
 Byron V. Garrett - writer
 Eric Carrington - writer
 Essej - writer
 Status - remix, producer
 Marcus L. Barnum - writer, producer
 Aaron-Carl Ragland - remix, producer

Track listings
 MD, US, #()
 "Above Horizons" - 4:16
 "Above Horizons (Original Mix)" - 5:38
 "Above Horizons (Aaron Carl Mix)" -  5:54

 MCD, US, #13746
 "Above Horizons" - 4:16
 "Above Horizons (Original Mix)" - 5:38
 "Above Horizons (Aaron Carl Mix)" -  5:54
 "Above Horizons (Aaron Carl Radio Edit)" - 4:30

References

General

 Specific

External links 
 

2009 singles
CeCe Peniston songs
Songs written by CeCe Peniston
2009 songs